Werauhia notata is a plant species in the genus Werauhia. This species is endemic to Costa Rica.

References

notata
Flora of Costa Rica